Pertti Ilari Lehikoinen (born 19 March 1952 in Helsinki) is a Finnish chess player who holds the ICCF title of correspondence chess grandmaster.  He won the 20th World Correspondence Chess Championship (started 25 October 2004, finished 20 February 2011).

References

External links 
 
 
 Home page of Pertti Lehikoinen
 Tournament table of the 20th World Correspondence Chess Championship Final

1952 births
Living people
Finnish chess players
Correspondence chess grandmasters
World Correspondence Chess Champions